The Code Monkeys Limited was a British video game developer based in Dewsbury, England and founded in February 1988 by Colin Hogg, Mark Kirkby and Elliot Gay. It was known for porting video games to various platforms. In February 2011, shareholders of the company decided to wind down the company, which was effective two weeks later.

History 
The Code Monkeys was founded by Colin Hogg and Mark Kirkby on 1 February 1988. The company went on to develop games for home computers as far back as the ZX81 and video game consoles such as the Mega Drive and the original PlayStation; for the last (but also for the PlayStation 2) they developed all budget interactive titles taken from Dingo Pictures' animated films, which were published first by Midas and then by Phoenix Games. In January 2010 the company scaled back its development team because of "production needs and predictions" for the year ahead. On 1 February 2011, shareholders of The Code Monkeys voted to cease trading, a move that was effective on 14 February 2011.

Games 
 Show Jumping (1986) (ZX Spectrum)
 The Games: Summer Edition (1988) (Amiga, Atari ST)
 The Games: Winter Edition (1988) (Atari ST)
 NorthStar (1988) (Atari ST)
 Mean Streets (1989-90) (Commodore 64, Amiga, Atari ST)
 Gunboat (1990-92) (Amstrad CPC, ZX Spectrum, TurboGrafx-16)
 The Game of Harmony (1990-91) (Commodore 64, Amstrad CPC, ZX Spectrum, Game Boy)
 Crime Wave (1990) (Amiga, Atari ST)
 Turrican (1991) (Mega Drive, TurboGrafx-16, Game Boy)
 Onslaught (1991) (Mega Drive)
 Universal Soldier (1992) (Mega Drive, Game Boy)
 Asteroids (1992) (Game Boy)
 Missile Command (1992-99) (Game Boy, Game Boy Color)
 Centipede (1992) (Game Boy)
 Road Rash (1993) (Game Boy)
 Tomcat Alley (1994) (Mega-CD)
 Surgical Strike (1995) (Mega-CD, 32X)
 Wirehead (1995) (Mega-CD)
 Live Wire! (1999) (PlayStation, Windows)
 Nice Cats (2000) (PlayStation)
 Force 21 (2000) (Game Boy Color)
 Goofy's Fun House (2001) (PlayStation)
 Worms World Party (2001) (PlayStation)
 Shrek: Treasure Hunt (2002) (PlayStation)
 The Simpsons Skateboarding (2002) (PlayStation 2)
 Dinosaurs (2003-04) (PlayStation, PlayStation 2)
 Winky the Little Bear (2003) (PlayStation)
 Atlantis: The Lost Continent (2003) (PlayStation)
 CT Special Forces 3: Bioterror (2004) (PlayStation)
 Dalmatians 3 (2004) (PlayStation 2)
 Legend of Herkules (2004) (PlayStation 2)
 Garfield (2004) (PlayStation 2, Windows)
 Jump: Free Running (2007) (J2ME)
 Alan Hansen's Sports Challenge (2007) (PlayStation 2)
 King of Clubs (2007) (PlayStation 2)
 Castlevania: Aria of Sorrow (2008) (J2ME)
 International Athletics (2008) (Nintendo DS)
Dalmatinas 4 (2008/2009) (Wii, DS)
 8BallAllstars (2009) (Nintendo DS)
 Casper's Scare School: Spooky Sports Day (2010) (Wii, DS)
 Triple Shot Sports (2010) (Wii)
 Triple Throwing Sports (2010) (Wii)
 Triple Jumping Sports (2010) (Wii)
 Triple Running Sports (2010) (Wii)
 Manic Monkey Mayhem (2010-12) (PlayStation Portable, PlayStation 3, Wii, PlayStation Vita)

References

External links
 Official website via Internet Archive
The Code Monkeys at MobyGames

Defunct companies based in Yorkshire
Video game companies established in 1988
Video game companies disestablished in 2011
Defunct video game companies of the United Kingdom